Richard Bruce Kind (born November 22, 1956) is an American actor and comedian, known for his roles as Dr. Mark Devanow in Mad About You (1992–1999, 2019), Paul Lassiter in Spin City (1996–2002), Andy in Curb Your Enthusiasm (2002–2021), and as Arthur in A Serious Man (2009). 

Kind is also known for his voice performances in various Pixar films such as A Bug's Life (1998), the first two films of the Cars franchise (2006–2011), Toy Story 3 (2010), and Inside Out (2015). Kind voices Marty Glouberman in the Netflix animated series Big Mouth (2017–present).

Kind appeared in the IFC mockumentary series Documentary Now! episode "Original Cast Album: Co-Op" and the children's musical special John Mulaney & the Sack Lunch Bunch (2019). He was nominated for a Tony Award for Best Featured Actor in a Play for his role as Marcus Hoff in the 2013 Broadway production of The Big Knife.

Early life
Kind was born to a Jewish family on November 22, 1956, in the New Jersey capital of Trenton, the son of Alice, a homemaker, and Samuel Kind, a jeweler who formerly owned La Vake's Jewelry in Princeton. With his younger sister, Joanne, he grew up in Lower Makefield Township, Bucks County, Pennsylvania. Kind attended Pennsbury High School with fellow actor Robert Curtis Brown, and he graduated in 1974. In 1978 he graduated from Northwestern University, where he was in the fraternity Sigma Alpha Epsilon. He is also an alumnus of The Second City in Chicago.

Career

Television
Kind portrayed Dr. Mark Devanow on Mad About You throughout the show's run, although after he took the role of Paul Lassiter on Spin City, he appeared on Mad About You with less frequency. Kind and Michael Boatman were the only two actors to appear in every episode of Spin City. Kind reprised his role in the 2019 revival of Mad About You. While these are his two highest-profile TV appearances, his first big break on television was as a member of the ensemble cast of Carol Burnett's brief return to sketch comedy, Carol & Company, which ran for two seasons beginning in 1990 on NBC. Kind served as a guest panelist on the 2000 revival of the television game show To Tell the Truth.

He appeared in eight episodes of Larry David's Curb Your Enthusiasm between 2002 and 2021 as Larry's cousin Andy. In 2006, he guest starred on Stargate Atlantis as Lucius Lavin, in the episodes "Irresistible" and "Irresponsible," making him the only actor to appear in both the original Stargate film and in Stargate Atlantis (as different characters).

Kind had a recurring role in Scrubs as Harvey Corman, an annoying hypochondriac, who claimed that having the same name as Harvey Korman did not "get [him] as much action as you may think". He also played a role on USA's crime comedy Psych as Hugo, an astronomer who killed a partner for credit for the discovery of a planet ("From the Earth to the Starbucks"), and later on Law & Order: Criminal Intent as a wealthy philanthropist who kills his sister-in-law and niece to protect the money he uses to fund his philanthropic work ("Privilege"). Kind guest-starred on the Disney Channel series Even Stevens, where he played the surly Uncle Chuck. He appeared in an episode of CBS' Two and a Half Men with former Spin City co-star Charlie Sheen on November 12, 2007. He also played a small role on TNT's hit show Leverage playing the part of a corrupt mayor in the second season two-part finale.

He played the role of burnt spy Jesse's ex-boss Marv in three episodes of season 4 of Burn Notice. In 2011, Kind guest-starred in an episode of the ABC sitcom Mr. Sunshine as Rod the Bod. He starred in the HBO series Luck until its cancellation, and he is also the spokesman for On-Cor frozen foods. In February 2013, he made a guest appearance on Kroll Show.

In 2015, he played the GED instructor on Unbreakable Kimmy Schmidt and Mayor Aubrey James in Gotham.

Film
Kind had a minor role as Gary Meyers, an archaeologist who translated the symbols on the Stargate prior to James Spader's character's involvement in the 1994 movie Stargate. He appeared in the film National Lampoon's Bag Boy in 2007. Kind played David's father in the Prime series "Red Oaks."

In 2007, Kind played a short role in the indie film The Visitor as Richard Jenkins's neighbor, Jacob. Kind starred in the independent black comedy feature, The Understudy in 2008. In 2008, Kind performed the role of Voltaire in the New York City Opera production of Leonard Bernstein's Candide. Kind played the major supporting role of Arthur Gopnik in the Coen brothers' dark comedy film A Serious Man. He had a small role in Clint Eastwood's Hereafter as Christos Andryo, in 2010. In 2011, he played a supporting dramatic role as Mr. Camp in the feature film Fancypants. In 2012, he was featured in Divorce Invitation.

Actor/director George Clooney is a close friend, and was best man at Kind's wedding to Dana Stanley in 1999. Kind later went on to play the part of a casting director in Clooney's directorial debut Confessions of a Dangerous Mind. Kind also played himself in the short-lived HBO series Unscripted, which Clooney executive produced and directed with Grant Heslov, and played a small role in the film Argo as screenwriter Max Klein, which was produced by both Clooney and Heslov. He is set to appear in Ari Aster's horror film Beau Is Afraid (2023).

Theater
Kind created the role of Addison Mizner in Stephen Sondheim's Bounce, and has appeared on Broadway in The Tale of the Allergist's Wife (2000), The Producers (2002), and Sly Fox (2004). He also appeared as the "Jury Foreman" in the film The Producers (2005) and played the lead role of Max Bialystock in a Hollywood Bowl production during July 27–29, 2012. He played Pseudolus in A Funny Thing Happened on the Way to the Forum at the Sondheim Center for the Performing Arts in Fairfield, Iowa. Kind received a Tony Award nomination for his role in the 2013 Broadway production of The Big Knife. Kind has performed in radio/audio plays for the LA Theatre Works and the Hollywood Theater of the Ear.

Voice work
His voice credits include Tom in Tom and Jerry: The Movie, Molt in Disney/Pixar's A Bug's Life, Van in Disney/Pixar's Cars and Cars 2, Bookworm in Toy Story 3, the narrator for Disney's Go Baby, and Larry the Anaconda in The Wild. In 2000 he did the voice of Mr. Dobbins in Tom Sawyer. In 2001–2002, he voiced the character of Pongo in five episodes of the animated series Oswald. He had a recurring role on the Disney Channel series Kim Possible as the villain Frugal Lucre. He guest starred in The Penguins of Madagascar as Roger the Alligator in the episodes "Haunted Habitat", "Roger Dodger", "Gator Watch", "April Fools", "The All Nighter Before Christmas", and "Operation: Neighbor Swap". He also played the role of Gumbo in an episode of Chowder on Cartoon Network. Kind guest-starred in Phineas and Ferb in the episode "Perry the Actorpus" as the Totally Tools executive. For audio drama, he appeared in three episodes of Around the Sun. In 2021, he narrated several commercials for Freestyle Libre, a device for diabetes patients to monitor their glucose levels.

Kind voiced Riley's imaginary friend Bing Bong in Pixar's Inside Out. He provides the voice of Olly and Saraline's dad Harvey Timbers in Welcome to the Wayne. He also provided the voice of Nightmare Cupcake from Crossy Road: The Series and "Clark" in the "Clark & Lewis Expedition" radio commercials for Horizon Air (with Patrick Warburton as "Lewis").

Personal life
Kind was married to Dana Stanley from 1999 to 2018. They have three children, a son Max, and two daughters, Samantha and Skylar.

Kind resides on the Upper West Side of Manhattan in New York City.

He was inducted into the Pennsbury High School Hall of Fame in the inaugural class on October 13, 2022.

Filmography

Discography 
 Bounce: Original Cast Recording (2004)
 Original Cast Album: Co-Op (Lakeshore Records, 2019)

Awards and nominations

References

External links

 
 

1956 births
20th-century American Jews
20th-century American male actors
21st-century American Jews
21st-century American male actors
Actors from Trenton, New Jersey
American male film actors
American male stage actors
American male television actors
American male voice actors
California Democrats
Drama Desk Award winners
Jewish American male actors
Living people
Male actors from New Jersey
Male actors from Pennsylvania
New Jersey Democrats
Northwestern University School of Communication alumni
People from Bucks County, Pennsylvania
Pennsbury High School alumni
Pennsylvania Democrats
Pixar people